Nigerian singer Mr 2Kay has released several singles and music videos.

As lead artist

Music videos

Studio albums

Extended plays

References

Discographies of Nigerian artists